Chaharduli Rural District is a rural district (dehestan) in the Central District of Asadabad County, Hamadan Province, Iran. At the 2006 census, its population was 9,367, in 2,155 families. The rural district has 26 villages.

All villages in the rural district are populated by Kurds, except Chenar-e Olya which is mixed Kurdish and Turkic.

References 

Rural Districts of Hamadan Province
Asadabad County
Kurdish settlements in Iran